Ronald Hamilton Blackburn (April 23, 1935 – April 29, 1998) was an American Major League Baseball right-handed pitcher for the Pittsburgh Pirates during the 1958 and 1959 seasons.

Career
Nicknamed "Blackie", he batted and threw right handed. He spent 11 seasons in the minor leagues and played two consecutive seasons for the Pirates.

His major league debut was on Opening Day 1958 against the Milwaukee Braves. The first batter he faced was Hank Aaron, who hit a single off  Blackburn, but he managed to keep the next nine batters off base for his first victory.

On the road for his two years with the Pirates, Blackburn's roommate was Bill Mazeroski. During these two years, he also was a teammate of legendary outfielder Roberto Clemente.

Blackburn played his last game for Pittsburgh on July 28, 1959.

Life
Born on April 23, 1935, in Mount Airy, North Carolina, Blackburn was raised in Kannapolis, North Carolina. He studied at Catawba College, where he met his wife Sandra Lower.

Following his playing retirement In 1964, Blackburn became a teacher and baseball coach at Western Carolina University, where he also attended school. He was the father of two sons: Ron H. Blackburn Jr. (born 1961) and Rick S. Blackburn (born 1964). The family lived in Cullowhee, North Carolina from 1964 to 1969 before moving to Morganton, North Carolina, where he worked as recreation director at the Western Correctional Center.

Blackburn died on April 29, 1998, from cancer at age 63. He is buried in Carolina Memorial Park, Concord, North Carolina.

References

External links

Baseball Library
History for Sale
Retrosheet

1935 births
1998 deaths
Asheville Tourists players
Burlington-Graham Pirates players
Catawba College alumni
Columbus Jets players
Dallas Rangers players
Deaths from cancer in North Carolina
Fond du Lac Panthers players
Macon Peaches players
Major League Baseball pitchers
New Orleans Pelicans (baseball) players
People from Mount Airy, North Carolina
Phoenix Stars players
Pittsburgh Pirates players
Salt Lake City Bees players
St. Jean Canadians players
Western Carolina Catamounts baseball players
Williamsport Grays players
People from Morganton, North Carolina